Weird Comics was a comic-book published by Fox Feature Syndicate from 1940 to 1942.

Weird Comics' characters included Birdman, Sorceress of Zoom, The Dart, Thor, Dynamite Thor, The Eagle, Dynamo and the Black Rider.

References

External links
 http://comicvine.gamespot.com/weird-comics/4050-31589/
 http://www.comics.org/series/175/

1940 comics debuts
1942 comics endings
Golden Age comics titles
Magazines established in 1940
Magazines disestablished in 1942
Fox Feature Syndicate
Fox Feature Syndicate titles